Public Not Admitted is a 1933 Czech comedy film directed by Martin Frič.

Cast
 Karel Lamač as JUDr. Anatol Brynda
 Truda Grosslichtová as Slávka Smídová
 Čeněk Šlégl as Jára Marek
 Ljuba Hermanová as Helena Králová (as Ljuba Herrmannová)
 Theodor Pištěk as Slávka's father
 Milada Gampeová as Slávka's mother
 Ella Nollová as Porter's wife
 Antonín Kandert as Attorney
 Josef Rovenský as Safe-cracker
 Jaroslav Marvan as Director
 Otto Heller as Cameraman
 Jan S. Kolár as Magistrate
 Milka Balek-Brodská as Scandalmonger
 Ferdinand Jarkovský as Blind man
 Rudolf Stahl as Assistant director

References

External links
 

1933 films
1933 comedy films
1930s Czech-language films
Czechoslovak black-and-white films
Films directed by Martin Frič
Czechoslovak comedy films
1930s Czech films